Cryptozoic Man was a four-issue comic book limited series by Bryan Johnson and Walt Flanagan. Flanagan described the series as the "creepiest cosmic spookshow ever witnessed!"

Publication history
The concept debuted on the AMC reality series Comic Book Men in which Johnson and Flanagan star. The other co-stars of Comic Book Men are also involved in the development of Cryptozoic Man.

Plot
Alan Ostman, a middle-aged husband/father, sees his life quickly unravel when his daughter goes missing on a camping trip in the Pacific Northwest...Bigfoot country. After Gray aliens abduct him from a roadside bar, he learns that the fate of the world is dependent on trapping the world's most legendary cryptids.

The comic centers on a character who is an amalgamation of a human being and legendary creatures like Bigfoot, the Loch Ness Monster and the Jersey Devil.

Collected editions
The series has been collected into a trade paperback:

Cryptozoic Man (collected issues #1-4, 112 pages, Dynamite Entertainment, October 2014)

References

External links 
 

Cryptozoology